The 18623 / 18624 Patna–Hatia Express is an Express train belonging to South Eastern Railway zone that runs between  and  in India. It is currently being operated with 18623/18624 train numbers on a daily basis.

Service

Route & Halts 

The important halts of the train are:

Coach composition

The train consists of 21 coaches :

 1 First AC 
 1 AC II Tier
 2 AC III Tier
 9 Sleeper Coaches
 5 General Unreserved
 2 Seating cum Luggage Rake

Traction

Both trains are hauled by a Mughalsarai-based WAP-4 electric locomotive from Patna to Hatia.

Rake sharing

The train shares its rake with 18696/18695 Islampur–Patna Express.

Direction reversal

The train reverses its direction 2 times:

See also 

 Patna Junction railway station
 Hatia railway station
 Patna–Haita Patliputra Express
 Patna–Hatia Super Express
 Islampur–Patna Express

Notes

References

External links 

 18623/Patna–Hatia Express
 18624/Hatia–Patna Express

Transport in Ranchi
Transport in Patna
Express trains in India
Rail transport in Bihar
Rail transport in Jharkhand
Rail transport in West Bengal